The Minoan language is the language (or languages) of the ancient Minoan civilization of Crete written in the Cretan hieroglyphs and later in the Linear A syllabary. As the Cretan hieroglyphs are undeciphered and Linear A only partly deciphered, the Minoan language is unknown and unclassified: indeed, with the existing evidence, it is impossible to be certain that the two scripts record the same language.

The Eteocretan language, attested in a few alphabetic inscriptions from Crete 1,000 years later, is possibly a descendant of Minoan, but is also unclassified.

Tradition
Minoan is mainly known from the inscriptions in Linear A, which are fairly legible by comparison with Linear B. The Cretan hieroglyphs are dated from the first half of the 2nd millennium BC. The Linear A texts, mostly written in clay tablets, are spread all over Crete with more than 40 localities on the island.

The Egyptian texts
From the Eighteenth Dynasty of Egypt come four texts containing names and sayings in the Keftiu language (de). They are, as usual in non-Egyptian texts, written in Egyptian hieroglyphs, which have allowed the pronunciation of those names and sayings to be reconstructed.
Magic Papyrus Harris ( Harris XII, 1–5); Beg. 18th Dynasty: a saying in the Keftiu language 
Writing board (B.M. 5647); early 18th Dynasty: school blackboard with Keftiu name
London Medical Papyrus (B.M., 10059); end of the 18th Dynasty: Two Sayings Against Disease (#32–33)
Aegean placard list (de): some Cretan place names.

On the basis of these texts, the phonetic system of the Minoan language can be reconstructed to have the following consonants:

Classification

Minoan is an unclassified language, or perhaps multiple indeterminate languages written in the same script. It has been compared inconclusively to the Indo-European, Semitic and Tyrsenian language families and is a language isolate.

Syntax
Brent Davis, a linguist and archaeologist at the University of Melbourne, has proposed that the basic word order of the language written in Linear A may be verb-subject-object (VSO), based on the properties of a common formulaic sequence found in Linear A.

References

External links 
 Duhoux, Yves. Pre-Hellenic languages of Crete

Minoan civilization
Unclassified languages of Europe
Extinct languages of Europe
Languages extinct in the 2nd millennium BC